Prince Hall Freemasonry is a branch of North American Freemasonry for African Americans founded by Prince Hall on September 29, 1784. There are two main branches of Prince Hall Freemasonry: the independent State Prince Hall Grand Lodges, most of which are recognized by Mainstream grand lodges, and those under the jurisdiction of the National Grand Lodge. Prince Hall Freemasonry is the oldest and largest (300,000+ initiated members) predominantly African-American fraternity in the nation.

History

Petitions for admittance into existing lodges 
Prior to the American Revolutionary War, Prince Hall and fourteen other free black men petitioned for admittance to the white Boston St. John's Lodge. They were declined. The Masonic fraternity was attractive to some free blacks like Prince Hall because freemasonry was founded upon ideals of liberty, equality and peace.

Grand Lodge of Ireland 
Having been rejected by colonial American Freemasonry, Hall and 14 others sought and were initiated into Masonry through Lodge No. 441 of the Grand Lodge of Ireland on March 6, 1775. The military lodge was attached to the 38th Foot (renamed "The 1st Staffordshire Regiment") in 1782. The Lodge was attached to the British forces stationed in Boston. Hall and other freedmen founded African Lodge No. 1 and he was elected Master. Other African Americans included Cyrus Johnston, Bueston Slinger, Prince Rees, John Canton, Peter Freeman, Benjamin Tiler, Duff Ruform, Thomas Santerson, Prince Rayden, Cato Speain, Boston Smith, Peter Best, Forten Horward, and Richard Titley, all of whom were free by birth.

When men wished to become Masons in the new nation the existing members of the Lodge had to vote unanimously to accept the petitioner. If any one white member voted against a black petitioner that person would be rejected. In a letter by General Albert Pike to his brother in 1875 he said, "I am not inclined to mettle in the matter. I took my obligations to white men, not to Negroes. When I have to accept Negroes as brothers or leave Masonry, I shall leave it." Masonic and Grand Lodges generally excluded African Americans. Since the votes were anonymous, it was impossible to identify the member who had voted against accepting a black member. The effect was the black men who had legitimately been made Masons in integrated jurisdictions could be rejected. Racial segregation existed until the 1960s.

The black Masons therefore had limited power. When the military lodges left the area, they were given the authority to meet as a lodge, take part in the Masonic procession on St. John's Day, and bury their dead with Masonic rites but could not confer Masonic degrees or perform any other essential functions of a fully operating Lodge.

Premier Grand Lodge of England 

Unable to create a charter, they applied to the Premier Grand Lodge of England. The Grand Master of the Premier Grand Lodge of England, H. R. H. The Duke of Cumberland, issued a charter for African Lodge No. 459 September 29, 1784, later renamed African Lodge No. 1. The lodge was the country's first African Masonic lodge.

Six years later, on March 22, 1797 Prince Hall organized a lodge in Philadelphia, called African Lodge #459, under Prince Hall's Charter. They later received their own charter. On June 25, 1797 he organized African Lodge (later known as Hiram Lodge #3) at Providence, Rhode Island.

Author and historian James Sidbury said "Prince Hall and those who joined him to found Boston's African Masonic Lodge built a fundamentally new "African" movement on a preexisting institutional foundation. Within that movement they asserted emotional, mythical, and genealogical links to the continent of Africa and its peoples.

In 1788 John Marrant became the chaplain of the African Masonic Lodge.

The lodge met in the "Golden Fleece," located near Boston Harbor, during the 1780s and 1790s. They later met at Kirby Street Temple in Boston.

Intervisitation attainment 
By 1797 there were at least thirty-four members in the Boston black lodge, but still the lodge was overlooked by white Boston Masons. Integration with the American white Masons was not imminent. Since they were unable to attain integration, the blacks concentrated on recognition from white Masons that, because black Masonry descending from Prince Hall of Massachusetts had received its charter from the English Grand Lodge, it was legitimate and not "clandestine", and was entitled to all Masonic rights, such as intervisitation between black and white lodges, without prejudice. Many Grand Masters hoped that ultimately recognition would lead to integration, but they knew it would be a long time before that happened.

African Grand Lodge 
After the death of Prince Hall, on December 4, 1807, the brethren were eager to form a Grand Lodge. On June 24, 1808 they organized African Grand Lodge with the lodges from Philadelphia, Providence and Boston, which was later renamed the Prince Hall Grand Lodge, in his honor.

The Lodge was struck from the rolls after the 1813 merger of the Antients and the Moderns (two rival Grand Lodges of England), along with many other Lodges. "At the amalgamation of the two Registers after the Union of the two Grand Lodges in England in 1813, African Lodge (and many others at home and abroad) was omitted from the register, there having been no contact for many years. African Lodge was, however, not formally erased."

Independent lodge 
After being denied acknowledgment by the Grand Lodge of Massachusetts, African Lodge declared itself to be an independent Grand Lodge, the African Grand Lodge of Massachusetts.

In 1827 the African Grand Lodge declared its independence from the United Grand Lodge of England, as the Grand Lodge of Massachusetts had done 45 years earlier. It also stated its independence from all of the white Grand Lodges in the United States, declaring itself to be a separate Masonic body.

This led to a tradition of separate, predominantly African-American jurisdictions in North America, known collectively as Prince Hall Freemasonry. Widespread racial segregation in North America made it impossible for African Americans to join many predominantly white lodges, and most predominantly white Grand Lodges in North America refused to recognize the Prince Hall Lodges and Prince Hall Masons in their territory as legitimate.

Both the Prince Hall and predominantly white Grand Lodges have had integrated membership for many years now, though in some Southern states this had been policy but not actual practice. Today, Prince Hall Affiliated Grand Lodges are recognized by the United Grand Lodge of England (UGLE), as well as the overwhelming majority of US state Grand Lodges and even many international Grand Lodges. The situation is complicated by the level of recognition that is granted, with some lodges giving full "blanket" recognition to all Prince Hall Grand Lodges, while others put on limits with regard to issues such as "intervisitation rights" or dual membership, sometimes treating Prince Hall Grand Lodges as regular but foreign jurisdictions.

Organization
There are two competing sets of organizations within Prince Hall Freemasonry. A minority of lodges, which are subject to the Prince Hall National Grand Lodge, are referred to as Prince Hall Origin (PHO) traces its lineage back to African Lodge #459, and are regular and recognized by some Grand Lodges in American territory. The majority of lodges, which are subject to 41 independent state grand lodges, and are known as Prince Hall Affiliation (PHA).

The Conference of Prince Hall Grand Masters determines the regularity of Prince Hall Freemasonry known as Prince Hall Affiliation (PHA). All regular and recognized Prince Hall Grand Lodges Prince Hall Affiliation (PHA) are represented at the Conference. A comprehensive list of all Prince Hall grand lodges deemed regular is listed on the conference website. Each regular Grand Lodge also traces its lineage back to African Lodge #459, where Prince Hall was made a Mason. The group using the name Prince Hall Origin has no affiliation to the conference of Prince Hall Grand Masters.

National and international lodges 
Today, predominantly black Prince Hall Grand Lodges exist in the original state jurisdictions of the United States; additionally, Prince Hall jurisdictions have been established in Canada, the Caribbean, Liberia, and Brazil governing Prince Hall Lodges throughout the world.

The Prince Hall Grand Lodge of the Caribbean was founded with the assistance of the Prince Hall Grand Lodge of New York. It is based in Christ Church, Barbados, the location of Prince Hall's birth. A monument to Prince Hall has been erected outside the Grand Lodge building. Caribbean Prince Hall Masonry was established in Barbados with the chartering of Prince Hall Memorial Lodge #100 in July 1965 by the Grand Master and officers of the Prince Hall Grand Lodge of the State of New York and Jurisdiction. The same jurisdiction subsequently chartered additional lodges in Guyana, St. Maarten, St. Lucia, Barbados, and Dominica, constituting them into a District administration known as the New York 9th District (Caribbean). In June 1975 senior members met at the New York Sheraton Hotel to commence discussion of the possible formation of an independent Caribbean Grand Lodge. Following many years of discussion the Prince Hall Grand Lodge of the Caribbean and Jurisdiction was finally inaugurated on 24 April 1993. The Grand Lodge Prince Hall São Paulo, Brazil, was chartered by the Prince Hall National Grand Lodge on August 20th 2022.

Legacy 
Prince Hall's legacy as a Freemason and a leader has survived with the lodges; Hall is considered the "father of African-American Freemasonry". As a Georgia Mason noted, the original local lodge rules written by Prince Hall and his followers in the late 18th century were the first set of regulations drafted by colored men for self-government in the United States, and Masonry ever since has striven to teach its members 'the fundamentals of central government' which is the basis of American life."

After nearly two centuries of controversy, the Grand Lodge of England was asked by a US "mainstream" Grand Lodge to decide the matter of Prince Hall Masonic legitimacy.

While no Grand Lodge of any kind is universally recognized, at present, Prince Hall Masonry is recognized by some UGLE-recognized Grand Lodges and not by others, but it is working its way toward further recognition.

When two Grand Lodges recognize and are in Masonic communication with each other, they are said to be in amity, and the brethren of each may visit each other's lodges and interact Masonically. When two Grand Lodges are not in amity, inter-visitation is not allowed. Exclusive Jurisdiction can be waived when the two over-lapping Grand Lodges are themselves in Amity and agree to share jurisdiction (for example, since the Grand Lodge of Connecticut is in Amity with the Prince Hall Grand Lodge of Connecticut, the principle of Exclusive Jurisdiction does not apply, and other Grand Lodges may recognize both).

After carefully studying the records, the Grand Lodge of England concluded that the original Prince Hall Grand Lodge of Massachusetts was indeed entitled to Masonic recognition, despite the general tradition of "exclusive jurisdiction", which meant that only one recognized Masonic body could exist in each state.

According to data compiled in 2021, 46 out of the 51 mainstream U.S. Grand Lodges recognize Prince Hall Grand Lodges. The few mainstream state Grand Lodges that currently do not recognize Prince Hall Grand Lodges are located in southern states, an area with an estimated 50% of Prince Hall Freemasons:  Mississippi, Louisiana, Arkansas, South Carolina and West Virginia. While African-Americans can join any lodge in North America, Prince Hall Masonry remains a vital part of American tradition.

Notable members
The organisation is named after:
 Prince Hall, Boston, Massachusetts, Grand Master 1791–1807.
There have been many other notable Masons who were affiliated with Prince Hall originated Grand Lodges, including:
 Norris Wright Cuney, American politician, businessman, union leader, and civil rights activist; 1st (1875–1876) and 4th (1879–1881) Grand Master, Most Worshipful Prince Hall Grand Lodge of Texas.
 Thomas Dalton, Boston, Massachusetts, Grand Master 1831–1832, son-in-law of Barzillai Lew. He and David Walker oversaw the publication of John T. Hilton's An Address, Delivered Before the African Grand Lodge of Boston, No. 459, June 24th, 1828, by John T. Hilton: On the Annual Festival, of St. John the Baptist (Boston, 1828).
 Duke Ellington Harlem Renaissance Jazz musician and composer.
 A. G. Gaston, Entrepreneur.
 Al Green, American singer, songwriter, and record producer.
 John T. Hilton, Grand Master 1826–1827 Hilton helped organize the National Grand Lodge of Prince Hall Freemasonry and served as the first National Grand Master. Hilton was Grand Master of the National Grand Lodge of North America for ten years.
 Jesse Jackson, Civil Rights leader.
 Walker Lewis, Lowell, Massachusetts, Grand Master 1829–1830. After the African Lodge declared its independence from the Grand Lodge of London and became its own African Grand Lodge, Walker Lewis was the Grand Master of African Grand Lodge #1 for 1829 and 1830.
 Thurgood Marshall, lawyer, first African American to serve on the Supreme Court of the United States.
 George Middleton, Boston, Massachusetts, Grand Master 1809–1810. Commander, Bucks of America, a unit of black soldiers during the American Revolution. The unit received a flag from Governor John Hancock for its faithful service. Middleton was also a founder of the African Benevolent Society.
 Richard Pryor, Comedian, Actor.
 Sugar Ray Robinson, Hall of Fame boxer.
 Booker T. Washington, Educator, Civil Rights leader.
 James Monroe Whitfield, Abolitionist poet from Exeter, NH. Author of "America and other Poems" 1853. In 1864–1869 he was Grand Master of the California order of Prince Hall Masons. Originally a member of Hannibal #1. He is buried in the Masonic Cemetery in San Francisco.
 Harry Albro Williamson, prolific researcher and writer on the subject of black Freemasonry.
 US Representative Louis Stokes,
 US Representative John Conyers
 US Representative  Charles Rangel,
 US Representative John Lewis
 US Representative Ralph Metcalfe
 US Representative Kweisi Mfume
 US Representative Elijah Cummings

See also
 Prince Hall Mystic Cemetery
 List of Freemasons
 Masonic Order of Liberia
 Prince Hall Order of the Eastern Star
 List of African-American Greek and fraternal organizations

Footnotes

Further reading 
 David L. Gray, Inside Prince Hall. Lancaster, Virginia: Anchor Communications LLC, 2004.
 Peter P. Hinks and Stephen Kantrowitz (eds.), All Men Free and Brethren: Essays on the History of African American Freemasonry. Ithaca, NY: Cornell University Press, 2013.
 Gregory S. Kearse, "The Bucks of America & Prince Hall Freemasonry" Prince Hall Masonic Digest Newspaper, (Washington, D.C. 2012), 8.
 Alton G. Roundtree and Paul M. Bessel, Out of the Shadows: Prince Hall Freemasonry in America, 200 Years of Endurance. Forestville MD: KLR Publishing, 2006.
 Alton G. Roundtree, The National Grand Lodge and Prince Hall Freemasonry: The Untold Truth. Forestville MD: KLR Publishing, 2010.

External links
 Conference of Grand Masters Prince Hall Masons, Inc. – an umbrella group for Prince Hall affiliated Grand Lodges and Grand Chapters of the Eastern Star.
 Prince Hall Freemasonry
 A directory of Prince Hall Affiliated Grand Lodges
 Prince Hall Revisited by Tony Pope, editor of the Australian & New Zealand Masonic Research Council's publications.
 The Black Heritage Trail The George Middleton House Boston African-American National Historic Site
 Museum of Afro-American History website George Middleton house and has photo of Bucks of America flag-for reference only} 
 Famous Prince Hall Freemasons

 
Freemasonry in the United States
Ethnic fraternal orders in the United States
Black elite

pt:Maçonaria Prince Hall